Conneauttee Creek is a  long 4th order tributary to French Creek in Crawford County, Pennsylvania.  This is the only stream of this name in the United States.

Variant names
According to the Geographic Names Information System, it has also been known historically as:
Big Conneauttee Creek
Conneautte Creek

Course
Conneautee Creek rises about 1.5 miles southeast of McLane, Pennsylvania, and then flows generally south and southeast, through Edinboro Lake to join French Creek just northwest of Cambridge Springs, Pennsylvania.

Watershed
Conneauttee Creek drains  of area, receives about 45.2 in/year of precipitation, has a wetness index of 466.55, and is about 49% forested.

See also
 List of rivers of Pennsylvania

References

Rivers of Pennsylvania
Rivers of Crawford County, Pennsylvania
Rivers of Erie County, Pennsylvania